Laval means The Valley in old French and is the name of:

People
 House of Laval, a French noble family originating from the town of Laval, Mayenne
 Laval (surname)

Places

Belgium
 Laval, a village in the municipality of Sainte-Ode, Luxembourg Province.

Canada
 Laval, Quebec, a city and an administrative region coextensive with the city in southern Quebec, Canada, part of the Montreal area
 Îles Laval, an archipelago within the limits of the above city
 Laval (electoral district), former riding in Canada
 Laval (provincial electoral district), former provincial riding in Quebec
 Université Laval, a university in Quebec City
 Laval Rouge et Or, the university's varsity sports program

France
 Arrondissement of Laval, an arrondissement in the Mayenne department in the Pays de la Loire region
 Laval, Mayenne, a commune in the Mayenne department
 Laval-Atger, a commune in the Lozère department
 Laval-d'Aix, a commune in the Drôme department
 Laval-d'Aurelle, a commune in the Ardèche department
 Laval-de-Cère, a commune in the Lot department
 Laval-du-Tarn, a commune in the Lozère department
 Laval-en-Belledonne, a commune in the Isère department
 Laval-en-Brie, a commune in the Seine-et-Marne department
 Laval-en-Laonnois, a commune in the Aisne department
 Laval-le-Prieuré, a commune in the Doubs department
 Laval-Morency, a commune in the Ardennes department
 Laval-Pradel, a commune in the Gard department
 Laval-Roquecezière, a commune in the Aveyron department
 Laval-Saint-Roman, a commune in the Gard department
 Laval-sur-Doulon, a commune in the Haute-Loire department
 Laval-sur-Luzège, a commune in the Corrèze department
 Laval-sur-Tourbe, a commune in the Marne department
 Laval-sur-Vologne, a commune in the Vosges department
 Bonchamp-lès-Laval, a commune in the Mayenne department
 Le Poët-Laval, a commune in the Drôme department
 Magnac-Laval, a commune in the Haute-Vienne department
 Mont-de-Laval, a commune in the Doubs department
 Saint-Genis-Laval, a commune in the Rhône department
 Saint-Germain-Laval, Loire, a commune in the Loire department
 Saint-Germain-Laval, Seine-et-Marne, a commune in the Seine-et-Marne department
 Saint-Pierre-Laval, a commune in the Allier department
 Viols-en-Laval, a commune in the Hérault department

Other
 Name of the prince of the Lion Tribe and protagonist of the Legends of Chima series
 Stade Lavallois, an association football club in France

See also
 La Val, a comune in South Tyrol, Italy
 Leval (disambiguation)